Attabad, also spelt Atabad, is a town located in Gilgit−Baltistan, Pakistan.

See also
 Attabad Lake

References

Populated places in Hunza District